Ellen Rosenbush edited Harper's Magazine from 2010 to 2019. During her tenure the magazine won two National Magazine Awards and received a total of 12 nominations.
Rosenbush, the fourteenth editor of the magazine, is the first woman to hold the editor position at Harper’s in its 164-year history.

References

"Harper's Magazine Appoints Its First Ever Female Editor" - Business Insider (http://www.businessinsider.com/harpers-magazine-appoints-its-first-ever-female-editor-2010-7)
"Harper's Magazine names new editor" - Crain's New York Business (http://www.crainsnewyork.com/article/20100726/FREE/100729878/harpers-magazine-names-new-editor)

Living people
American magazine editors
Women magazine editors
Year of birth missing (living people)
Harper's Magazine people